Lulakabad-e Sofla (also Romanized as Lūlakābād-e Soflá; also known as Lūlīkābād-e Pā'īn, Lūlīkābād-e Şūfīās, and Lūlīk-e Soflá) is a village in Chahriq Rural District, Kuhsar District, Salmas County, West Azerbaijan Province, Iran. At the 2006 census, its population was 143, in 23 families.

References 

Populated places in Salmas County